Dylan John Riley (born 1971) is Professor of Sociology at the University of California, Berkeley, and is on the editorial committee of the New Left Review (NLR). He writes for the NLR and Jacobin.

Publications

Books 
 Doctoral dissertation, Hegemony and Domination: Civil Society and Regime Variation in Inter-War Europe, University of California, Los Angeles, 2002
 The Civic Foundations of Fascism in Europe: Italy, Spain, and Romania 1870-1945, Johns Hopkins University Press, 2010
 How Societies and States Count: A Comparative Genealogy of Censuses with Rebecca Jean Emigh and Patricia Ahmed, Palgrave Press, 2016:
 Volume 1: Antecedents of Censuses: From Medieval to Nation States
 Volume 2: Changes in Censuses: From Imperialism to Welfare States
 upcoming Rethinking Liberal Democracy and the Fascist Legacy

Selected papers 
 The Third Reich as Rogue Regime: Adam Tooze’s Wages of Destruction, Historical Materialism, vol. 22, nos 3-4, 2014

References

External links
 American Brumaire?, New Left Review 103, January–February 2017
 What is Trump?, New Left Review 114, November–December 2018
 The 18th Brumaire of Donald Trump, February 1, 2017

Living people
1971 births
Place of birth missing (living people)
American sociologists
University of California, Berkeley faculty
Date of birth missing (living people)
Historians of fascism